Beaumont is a commune in the Gers department in southwestern France.

Geography

Population

Sites of interest 
The Château de Beaumont was constructed in the 14th century. Significant building work was carried out in the 15th, 17th and 18th centuries.

The Compostela pilgrimage route runs through the village passing by the castle and through the rough trails around it.

See also
Communes of the Gers department

References

Communes of Gers
World Heritage Sites in France